Tampere sub-region  is a subdivision of Pirkanmaa and one of the sub-regions of Finland since 2009. It covers an area of 4,977 km2 and has a population of 389,896 as of 2014.

Municipalities

 Hämeenkyrö
 Kangasala
 Kuhmoinen
 Lempäälä
 Nokia
 Orivesi
 Pirkkala
 Pälkäne
 Tampere
 Vesilahti
 Ylöjärvi

Politics
Results of the 2018 Finnish presidential election:

 Sauli Niinistö   62.8%
 Pekka Haavisto   15.0%
 Laura Huhtasaari   7.0%
 Paavo Väyrynen   5.1%
 Merja Kyllönen   3.7%
 Tuula Haatainen   3.5%
 Matti Vanhanen   2.2%
 Nils Torvalds   0.7%

See also 
 Helsinki sub-region

References 

Sub-regions of Finland
Geography of Pirkanmaa